Opticon may refer to:

In business
 Opticon (conference), an annual user conference organized by Optimizely
 OptiCon, an annual conference organized by the American Board of Opticianry
 Opticon is a traffic signal preemption system from Global Traffic Technologies.

In music
 Opticon, a single from released by the band Orgy in 2000

In publishing
 Opticon (typeface), a typeface developed for newspapers in 1935

See also 

 Panopticon (disambiguation)